Harry Joseph Nossek (February 9, 1893 – September 7, 1965) was an American football and basketball coach.  He was the 19th head football coach at Doane College in Crete, Nebraska, serving for the 1923 season, and compiling a record of 3–4. Nossek was also the head basketball coach at Doane in 1923–24, tallying a mark of 4–13.

Head coaching record

Football

References

External links
 

1893 births
1965 deaths
Doane Tigers football coaches
Doane Tigers men's basketball coaches
Springfield Pride football players